South Grove Township is one of nineteen townships in DeKalb County, Illinois, USA. As of the 2010 census, its population was 512 and it contained 209 housing units. South Grove Township was renamed from Vernon Township on November 20, 1850.

Geography

Unincorporated towns
 Esmond at

Cemeteries
 Greenview
 South Grove

Airports and landing strips
 Vodden Airport

Demographics

School districts
 DeKalb Community Unit School District 428
 Hiawatha Community Unit School District 426
 Sycamore Community Unit School District 427

Political districts
 Illinois's 16th congressional district
 State House District 70
 State Senate District 35

References
 
 US Census Bureau 2009 TIGER/Line Shapefiles
 US National Atlas

External links
 City-Data.com
 Illinois State Archives
 Township Officials of Illinois
 DeKalb County Official Site
 Early history of South Grove, Il

Townships in DeKalb County, Illinois
Populated places established in 1850
Townships in Illinois